The canton of Saint-Herblain-2 is an administrative division of the Loire-Atlantique department, western France. It was created at the French canton reorganisation which came into effect in March 2015. Its seat is in Saint-Herblain.

It consists of the following communes:
Orvault
Saint-Herblain (partly)

References

Cantons of Loire-Atlantique